Chełmiec  is a village in Nowy Sącz County, Lesser Poland Voivodeship, in southern Poland. It is the seat of the gmina (administrative district) called Gmina Chełmiec.

The village has a population of 2,657.

References

Villages in Nowy Sącz County